Parzniew  is a village in the administrative district of Gmina Brwinów, within Pruszków County, Masovian Voivodeship, in east-central Poland.

During the Invasion of Poland, on 12 September 1939, around 100 Polish prisoners of war were massacred in Parzniew by the German Wehrmacht.

References

Parzniew
Nazi war crimes in Poland